San Francisco, officially the Municipality of San Francisco,  is a 3rd class municipality in the province of Cebu, Philippines. According to the 2020 census, it has a population of 59,236 people.

It is one of the municipalities that comprise the Camotes Islands.

San Francisco is bordered to the north by the Province of Leyte in the Camotes Sea, to the west is the Camotes Sea Facing Catmon, to the east is the island of Poro with town of Poro and to the south is the Camotes Sea.

History

Protohistory
Carl Guthe, director of the University of Michigan Anthropological Museum, during his 1923-25 collecting trip and explorations of archaeological sites in the Philippines, conducted an archeological dig in a cave site on Tulang. Guthe reported it to contain bone fragments and teeth of about 60 individuals. Associated grave goods included earthenware pottery, shell bracelets, bronze and iron artefacts (iron tang, bronze chisel, iron blade), glass and stone beads, hammerstone and pestle. Filed teeth were also recovered from this site.

21st century
Just before Typhoon Yolanda struck in November 2013, the mayor of San Francisco ordered the evacuation of all the residents (approximately 1,000) to the main island. This was credited with saving their lives as all houses on the island (about 500) were completely destroyed.

Geography 
San Francisco consists primarily of Pacijan (also known as Pajican) and Tulang (area less than 1 km2, just north of Pacijan) islands, which are part of the Camotes Islands (which also include Poro and Ponson islands). They are located east of the main island of Cebu, south and west of Leyte and north of Bohol.

Pacijan (Pajican) Island 
A  causeway crosses the mangrove swamp to connect Pacijan and Poro islands. It was constructed during the Spanish era, to bridge the islands for easier trading and attending services in Poro church.

Tulang 
Tulang island (known locally as Tulang Diot) is a five-minute boat ride from Tulang Dako on the main island of Pacijan. Both Tulang Diot and Tulang Dako are part of Esperanza barangay. The islet is almost entirely covered with coconut palms and measures about : the residential area is confined to a small triangle at the southern end.

Barangays 
San Francisco comprises 15 barangays:

Climate

Demographics

Language

The town is home to the Porohanon language, one of the most endangered languages in the Visayas. The language is only used in the Poro islands. The language is classified as distinct from Sebwano (Bisaya) by the Komisyon ng Wikang Filipino and is vital to the culture and arts of the Porohanon people.

Economy

Notes

References

Sources

External links
 San Francisco Municipality Camotes
 [ Philippine Standard Geographic Code]

Municipalities of Cebu
Island municipalities in the Philippines